The long-tailed meadowlark (Leistes loyca) is a passerine bird of southern South America and the Falkland Islands, belonging to the meadowlark genus Leistes in the icterid family that looks very similar to the related endangered species, the Pampas meadowlark.

It is 25 to 28 cm long with a fairly long tail and a long, pointed bill. The male is mostly dark brown with blackish streaking. The breast and throat are bright red and there is a white spot on the face near the base of the bill. The bold supercilium is white behind the eye and red in front of it. Females are paler than the males with the red markings restricted to a wash on the belly and the supercilium and throat are buff.

It breeds in southern Chile and southern and western parts of Argentina. Some birds migrate northwards in winter. An endemic subspecies, L. loyca falklandica, occurs in the Falkland Islands, where it is known as the military starling. Long-tailed meadowlarks are found in open habitats such as grassland where they forage on the ground, feeding mainly on invertebrates.

The nest is made of dry grass and is built by the female. It is placed on or near the ground amongst grass. Whenever the female leaves the nest, she first walks  a few meters from it hiding among the dry grass in order to prevent the nest from being found by predators who see her leave. The same method is used when arriving at the nest, she first lands a few meters from the nest and then walks towards it. Two clutches of two to four eggs are laid during the breeding season. They are bluish-white with dark blotches and streaks.

References

Jaramillo, Alvaro; Burke, Peter & Beadle, David (2003) Field Guide to the Birds of Chile, Christopher Helm, London.
Woods, Robin W. (1988) Guide to Birds of the Falkland Islands, Anthony Nelson, Oswestry.

External links
Long-tailed meadowlark videos on the Internet Bird Collection
Stamps (for Chile, Falkland Islands) with range map
Long-tailed meadowlark photo gallery VIREO

long-tailed meadowlark
Birds of Patagonia
Birds of Argentina
Birds of Chile
Birds of the Falkland Islands
long-tailed meadowlark